Andover College may refer to: 
 Andover College (Hampshire), a college in Andover, Hampshire, England, UK
 Andover College (Maine), a college in Portland, Maine, US